Éric Morena (27 October 1951 – 16 November 2019) was a French singer. He was born in Saint-Omer and was made famous by his 1987 hit "Oh ! Mon bateau", which peaked at #22 in France. In 2003, he covered "L'Envie d'aimer" on the album Retour gagnant.

Discography

Singles
 1987 : "Oh ! Mon bateau" – #22 in France
 1987 : "Dernier Matin d'Asie" (charity single recorded by Sampan) – # 22 in France
 1988 : "Ramon et Pedro"
 1988 : "Je suis le toréro de l'amour"
 1989 : "Hissé...o"
 1989 : "La fiesta morena"
 1990 : "Pour toi Arménie" (charity single recorded by many artists) – #1 in France

References

1951 births
2019 deaths
People from Saint-Omer
French-language singers
French male singers
French pop singers